Boska may refer to:

Karl-Heinz Boska (1920–2004), a Hauptsturmführer (Chief Storm Leader/Captain) in the Waffen-SS during World War II
Boska gej, a village in the administrative district of Gmina Stromiec, Białobrzegi County, Masovian Voivodeship, east-central Poland
Avia BH-5, two-seat sport aircraft built in Czechoslovakia in 1923

See also
Bosko (disambiguation)